Tess Critchlow (born June 20, 1995) is a Canadian snowboarder, competing in the discipline of snowboard cross.

Career

Winter Olympics
In January 2018, Critchlow was named to Canada's 2018 Olympic team.

In January 2022, Critchlow was named to Canada's 2022 Olympic team.

References

1995 births
Living people
Canadian female snowboarders
Sportspeople from Prince George, British Columbia
Snowboarders at the 2018 Winter Olympics
Snowboarders at the 2022 Winter Olympics
Olympic snowboarders of Canada